Keith Brian Adamson (born 3 July 1945 in Houghton-le-Spring, England) is an English former footballer.

He played for Tow Law Town, Barnsley and Scarborough.

References

1945 births
Living people
People from Houghton-le-Spring
Footballers from Tyne and Wear
English footballers
Association football forwards
Barnsley F.C. players
Scarborough F.C. players
English Football League players
Tow Law Town F.C. players